Ya FM (91.8 and 101.9) is a community radio station licensed in March 2015. The station is located in Zvishavane, Zimbabwe.

References

External links

Radio stations in Zimbabwe
Radio stations established in 2015
2015 establishments in Zimbabwe